E26 or E-26 may refer to:
 BMW E26 
 European route E26
 E26 screw, a type of Edison light bulb socket screw
 HMS E26, a British submarine
 Nimzo-Indian Defense, Sämisch variation, Encyclopedia of Chess Openings code
 Kinki Expressway and Hanwa Expressway (between Matsubara JCT and Wakayama JCT), route E26 in Japan
 South Klang Valley Expressway, route E26 in Malaysia